Stellingwerff is a surname. Notable people with the surname include:

 Hilary Stellingwerff (born 1981), Canadian track and field middle-distance runner
 Jacobus Stellingwerff (1667–1727), artist from the Northern Netherlands

See also
 Stellingwerf